Melt - Scandinavian Electro/Industrial Compilation is a various artists compilation album released in 1994 by Cyberware Productions. The album was reissued on April 9, 1996, by Fifth Colvmn Records.

Reception

Aiding & Abetting called "Melt "inconsistent" and "for every decent gothic pop bit like Neuroactive's "Obsession" there's at least one song that just doesn't work." AllMusic awarded the collection two and a half out of five stars and said "Melt culls releases from the Scandinavian-based label Cyberware Records, whose roster of artists runs the gamut from industrial to techno to ambient." Sonic Boom noted that "the first half of the compilation consists of more popular EBM style electro with the music slowly transitioning to darkwave instrumentals of a more experimental nature as the album progresses."

Track listing

Personnel
Adapted from the Melt - Scandinavian Electro/Industrial Compilation liner notes.

 Karri Suksia – compiling
 Jarkko Tuohimaa – mastering

Release history

References

External links 
 

1994 compilation albums
Fifth Colvmn Records compilation albums